The 2017 Rutgers Scarlet Knights football team represented Rutgers University during the 2017 NCAA Division I FBS football season. The Scarlet Knights played their home games at High Point Solutions Stadium in Piscataway, New Jersey and competed as members of the East Division of the Big Ten Conference. They were led by second-year head coach Chris Ash. They finished the season 4–8, 3–6 in Big Ten play to finish in fifth place in the East Division.

Recruiting

Position key

Recruits

The Scarlet Knights signed a total of 26 recruits.

Schedule
Rutgers announced its 2017 football schedule on July 11, 2013. The 2017 schedule consisted of 6 home, 5 away, and 1 neutral site game in the regular season. The Scarlet Knights hosted Big Ten foes Michigan State, Ohio State, and Purdue, and traveled to Illinois, Indiana, Michigan, Nebraska, and Penn State. Rutgers played against Maryland in Bronx, New York at Yankee Stadium.

The Scarlet Knights hosted all three of the non-conference opponents, Eastern Michigan from the Mid-American Conference, Morgan State from the Mid-Eastern Athletic Conference and Washington from the Pac-12 Conference.

Schedule Source:

Game summaries

Washington

The Scarlet Knights opened the season by welcoming No. 8-ranked Washington to New Jersey. Rutgers took the early lead on a three-yard touchdown pass from Kyle Bolin to Janarion Grant. Washington answered with a field goal in the first quarter and a 61-yard punt return for a touchdown with the 3:50 seconds left in the half to take a 10–7 halftime lead. Though trailing, the Knights played well and hung with the highly ranked Huskies in the first half. However, Washington QB Jake Browning threw two second-half touchdown passes as Washington pulled away from the Scarlet Knights to win the game 30–14. The loss left the Scarlet Knights with an 0–1 record.

Eastern Michigan

Morgan State

at Nebraska

Ohio State

at Illinois

Purdue

at Michigan

Maryland

at Penn State

at Indiana

Michigan State

Roster and staff

Players in the 2018 NFL Draft

References

Rutgers
Rutgers Scarlet Knights football seasons
Rutgers Scarlet Knights football